Ivan Ivanovich Privalov (11 February 1891 – 13 July 1941) was a Russian mathematician best known for his work on analytic functions.

Biography 
Privalov graduated from Moscow State University (MSU) in 1913 studying under Dimitri Egorov and Nikolai Lusin. He obtained his master's degree from MSU in 1916 and became professor at Imperial Saratov University (1917—1922). In 1922 he was appointed as Professor at MSU and worked there for the rest of his life.

Corresponding member of the USSR Academy of Sciences (since 1939). Member of the French Mathematical Society (Société Mathématique de France) and the Mathematical Circle of Palermo (Circolo Matematico di Palermo).

Research work 
Privalov wrote Cauchy Integral (1918) which built on work by Fatou. He also worked on many problems jointly with Luzin. In 1934 he studied subharmonic functions, building on the work of Riesz.

PhD students 
 Samarii Aleksandrovich Galpern.

Publications

Books 
 I. I. Privalov, Subharmonic Functions, GITTL, Moscow, 1937.
 I. I. Privalov, Introduction to the Theory of Functions of a Complex Variable, GITTL, Moscow-Leningrad, 1948 (14n ed: 1999).
 I. I. Privalov, Boundary Properties of Analytic Functions, 2nd ed., GITTL, Moscow-Leningrad, 1950.

See also 
 Luzin–Privalov theorems

External links
 .
 .
 P. I. Kuznetsov and E. D. Solomentsev (1982). "Ivan Ivanovich Privalov (ninety years after his birth)" Russ. Math. Surv. 37: 152-174.

References

1891 births
1941 deaths
People from Nizhnelomovsky District
20th-century Russian mathematicians
Complex analysts
Mathematical analysts
Corresponding Members of the USSR Academy of Sciences